The Airtime Explorer is an Australian powered hang glider harness that was designed and produced by Airtime Products of Airlie Beach, Queensland. Now out of production, when it was available, it was supplied assembled.

Design and development
When combined with a cable-braced hang glider-style wing, the single-engine pusher configuration Explorer features weight-shift controls, foot-launching and landing.

The powered harness is mated to a standard hang glider wing. The wing is supported by a single tube-type king post and uses an "A" frame control bar. Dual retractable skids are provided to protect the propeller during take-off and landing. Electric starting and a carbon fiber folding  propeller are standard features.

Specifications (Explorer)

See also
Airtime Discovery

References

Explorer
2000s Australian ultralight aircraft
Single-engined pusher aircraft
Powered hang gliders